Dragon Lee (sometimes credited as "Bruce Lei"; born 1940) is an actor and practitioner of Taekwondo and Hapkido. He made a name for himself as a martial arts film star in the 1970s and 80s. His birth name is Moon Kyung-seok, but he has also been called Keo Ryong (literally "giant dragon") in South Korea.

According to his IMDB biography, Dragon Lee was born in what is now North Korea.

Lee eventually studied taekwondo with friend and actor Kim Tai-chung, who served as Bruce Lee's double in the final scenes of "Game of Death." It was at this stage of his life that Lee began studying also the Korean martial art of hapkido under Hwang In-Shik, who appeared with Bruce Lee in Way of the Dragon.

When Dragon Lee was at a theater, a man told him that he resembled Bruce Lee. That was a big compliment because Bruce Lee was popular at the time, and the man knew film directors in Hong Kong and helped Dragon Lee advance his career.

In his early 20s, Dragon Lee moved to Hong Kong and starred in numerous martial arts films, often credited as Bruce Lei because he bore a striking resemblance to Bruce Lee. Among Dragon Lee's many film credits is the semi-documentary The Real Bruce Lee (1977).

Dragon Lee moved back to Seoul, and is a television actor and producer. He also heads a South Korean actors' association.

Partial filmography
 I'm Not Bruce (2015)
 King's Women (2000)
 Emperor of the Underworld (1994)
 The Nationwide Constituency (1991)
 The Nationwide Constituency 2 (1994)
 Crime Stopper (1990)
 Ninja Champion (1986)
 Martial Monks of Shaolin Temple (1983)
 Dragon Claws (1982)
 Secret Ninja, Roaring Tiger (1982)
 The Dragon's Snake Fist (1981)
 Dragon Lee Fights Back (1981)
 Strike of Thunderkick Tiger (1981)
 Enter the Invincible Hero (1981)
 The Dragon's Showdown (1980)
 Champ Against Champ (1980)
 Mission For the Dragon (1980)
 The Clones of Bruce Lee (1981)
 Golden Dragon, Silver Snake (1980)
 Fist of Fury '81 (1979)
 Kung Fu Fever (1979)
 The Dragon, the Hero (1979)
 Fist of Dragon (1978)
 Enter the Deadly Dragon (1978)
 Enter Three Dragons (1978)
 Dragon Lee vs. The Five Brothers (1978)
 The 18 Amazones (1977)
 The Real Bruce Lee (1977)
 The Magnificent Duo (1976)
 Wild Dragon Lady (1976)
 Superfist (1975)

As producer
Two Man (1995)

Documentary
Amazing Masters (2000)

References

External links
 Clones of Bruce Lee - The Ultimate Guide To Bruce Lee Exploitation Cinema
Dragon Lee at Hong Kong Cinemagic.
 .

1958 births
Hong Kong male actors
Living people
Koryo-saram
Bruce Lee imitators
People from South Chungcheong Province
Hong Kong people of Korean descent
South Korean Buddhists
South Korean hapkido practitioners
South Korean male taekwondo practitioners